Paul Kuété (born 20 December 1972) is a Cameroonian long-distance runner. He competed in the men's marathon at the 1992 Summer Olympics.

References

1972 births
Living people
Athletes (track and field) at the 1992 Summer Olympics
Cameroonian male long-distance runners
Cameroonian male marathon runners
Olympic athletes of Cameroon
Place of birth missing (living people)